Ageratina jucunda,  called the Hammock snakeroot, is a North American species of plants in the family Asteraceae. It is found only in the southeastern United States, in the states of Georgia and Florida.

Etymology
Ageratina is derived from Greek meaning 'un-aging', in reference to the flowers keeping their color for a long time. This name was used by Dioscorides for a number of different plants.

References

External links

Atlas of Florida Vascular Plants

Deviant Art Fine Art Photography photo of Ageratina jucunda, taken by Ryan G. Fessenden
Hammock Snakeroot photos by Stephanie Sanchez, showing various species of butterflies pollinating Ageratina jucunda

jucunda
Flora of the Southeastern United States
Plants described in 1884